The 2015 Big East women's basketball tournament, officially known as the 2015 Big East Championship, was a tournament March 7–10, 2015, at Allstate Arena in the Chicago suburb of Rosemont, Illinois.

Seeds

Schedule

Source:

Bracket

Source:

See also
2015 Big East men's basketball tournament

References

External links
Big East website

Big East women's basketball tournament